Statistics of Swedish football Division 3 for the 2001 season.

League standings

Norra Norrland 2001

Mellersta Norrland 2001

Södra Norrland 2001

Norra Svealand 2001

Östra Svealand 2001

Västra Svealand 2001

Nordöstra Götaland 2001

Nordvästra Götaland 2001

Mellersta Götaland 2001

Sydöstra Götaland 2001

Sydvästra Götaland 2001

Södra Götaland 2001

Footnotes

References 

Swedish Football Division 3 seasons
4
Sweden
Sweden